"People Everyday" is a song by American hip hop group Arrested Development, released in July 1992 as the second single from their debut album, 3 Years, 5 Months & 2 Days in the Life Of... (1992). The song rose to number eight on the US Billboard Hot 100. It became their biggest hit in the United Kingdom, where it peaked at number two on the UK Singles Chart in November 1992. The song also reached the top 10 on the charts of Australia, France, and New Zealand, peaking at number six in all three countries.

Content
The song uses the chorus and basic structure of Sly & the Family Stone's 1969 hit "Everyday People", with new verses written by lead singer Speech. He also sings the lead, with additional lyrics sung by Dionne Farris, who is not an official member of the group. The single of this song, which was released in 1992, features additional singing vocals by DeAnna Fields, also known as Mawakana Auset, who is an extended family member of the group. DeAnna also appears in the video for this song, in addition to serving as wardrobe assistant for the video as well. It also uses a sample from "Tappan Zee" by Bob James.

The narrator describes an incident in which he is enjoying a day at the park, listening to music and spending time with his girlfriend. The couple's pleasure is interrupted by the arrival of several "niggas" who are drinking heavily, carrying firearms, and behaving disrespectfully toward the woman. The narrator hopes they will leave him in peace, but they instead begin to grope his girlfriend. He eventually flies into a rage and assaults one of the men, requiring the efforts of several police officers to pull him away. The narrator ends the song with a plea for people to treat each other with respect, since there is no way to predict when a verbal dispute might escalate into a fight or a killing.

Chart performance
"People Everyday" was a major hit on the charts on several continents and remains the group's most successful song, along with "Tennessee" and "Mr. Wendal". It peaked at number one on both the RPM Dance/Urban chart in Canada and on the Billboard Hot Rap Songs chart in the United States. In Europe, the single entered the top 10 in France (6) and the United Kingdom. In the latter, it reached number two in its third week at the UK Singles Chart, on November 1, 1992. It was held off reaching the top spot by Boyz II Men's "End of the Road". Additionally, "People Everyday" was a top-20 hit in Ireland (11) and the Netherlands (20), as well as on the Eurochart Hot 100, where it hit number 12. But it topped the European Dance Radio Chart in October 1992. The song was also a top-30 hit in Sweden (27). On the US Billboard Dance Club Songs chart, it peaked at number six, while peaking at number eight on the Billboard Hot 100. In Australia and New Zealand, it peaked at number six. 

The single was awarded with a gold record in Australia (35,000), New Zealand (5,000) and the US (500,000), and a silver record in the UK (200,000).

Critical reception
In an retrospective review, Daryl Easlea of BBC noted that "People Everyday", which updated Sly and the Family Stone's "Everyday People", "showed how they could embrace the past while modernising the message." Upon the release, Larry Flick from Billboard viewed it as a "languid, dancehall-spiced hip-hopper". He added that "uplifting, unity driven rhymes are delivered with laidback finesse. Tradeoff of rapping and singing works extremely well. Destined for hefty (and much deserved) success." Justin Wilson from The Cavalier Daily remarked that the group's "message of harmony and brotherhood" also resonated on songs like "People Everyday". Greg Kot from Chicago Tribune found that here, Speech "forcefully sets himself apart from the young toughs who roam the streets aiming to bring everyone down to their level. At times, he brings to mind the visionary fire of the late reggae legend Bob Marley." A reviewer from Music Weeks RM Dance Update declared it as a "great follow-up" to "Tennessee", that "takes us back to its roots. Musically this is a very strong mid-tempo hip hop track with a reggae style bassline — a sure club and radio hit".

Angus Batey from NME felt the music "works best where it's given room to breathe", as on the "reggae-flavoured" "People Everyday". Another editor, John Mulvey, viewed it as "a deceptively laid-back track", complimenting its "beautifully easy-going, strolling groove." He added, "Wise, warm and impeccably right-on". People Magazine noted that here, the band "scolds men who loiter on street corners, holding their crotches and being obscene". Adam Higginbotham from Select said that it "scrambles Sly Stone's anthem into reggae format." Another editor, Rupert Howe, constated that "a track like "People Everyday" contrasts the AD pro-African stance with that of a drug- and violence-addicted 'nigga'. "An African is proud of their culture and lives that pride out", Speech says. "While a nigga is just a social product, and that's nothing to be proud of." Alec Foege from Spin declared it as a "true '90s pop anthem", and "socially progressive and roots-conscious." Matthew Sag from Australian student newspaper Woroni found that the song is covering the issue of "street gangs".

Impact and legacy
British DJ and presenter Trevor Nelson picked the song as one of his favourites in 1996, saying, "It's so happy. It's a crowd participation, hope record, it's so cool. It came out it when there were a lot of emerging acts like Jamiroquai. They were light and happy and broke down all the barriers. This record has a feel-good factor of nine and I used to play it every morning before I got up!"

Track listings

 7-inch vinylA. "People Everyday" (Methamorphosis radio edit)
B. "People Everyday" (Methamorphosis radio version)

 US 12-inch singleA1. "People Everyday" (Metamorphosis mix) — 4:52
A2. "People Everyday" (LP version) — 3:26
A3. "People Everyday" (Maroon mix) — 3:39
B1. "People Everyday" (Metamorphosis instrumental) — 3:52
B2. "Children Play with Earth" (LP version) — 2:38

 US and Canadian cassette single "People Everyday" — 3:26
 "People Everyday" (Metamorphosis mix) — 4:52
 "Children Play with Earth" — 2:38

 European maxi-CD single'
 "People Everyday" (Metamorphosis radio edit)
 "People Everyday" (Metamorphosis radio version)
 "People Everyday" (Metamorphosis mix)
 "People Everyday" (album version)

Charts

Weekly charts

Year-end charts

Certifications

Release history

References

1992 singles
Arrested Development (group) songs
Chrysalis Records singles
Cooltempo Records singles
Music videos directed by Bruce Gowers
New jack swing songs
Songs written by Sly Stone